Flavio Orlandi (1921–2009) was a social democrat Italian politician who served at the European Parliament. He was a member of the Italian Democratic Socialist Party (PSDI) and served as its secretary between 1972 and 1975.

Biography
Orlandi was born in Canino on 12 April 1921. He worked as the political director of the socialist newspaper Avanti! from 1966 to 1969, together with Gaetano Arfé. Orlandi joined the PSDI and was its secretary from June 1972 to June 1975. He was replaced by Mario Tanassi in the post. In the period between 1979 and 1984 Orlandi was a member of the European Parliament, being part of the socialist group representing the Italian Democratic Socialist Party. Orlandi died in Rome on 8 January 2009.

References

External links

20th-century Italian journalists
1921 births
2009 deaths
Italian Democratic Socialists MEPs
MEPs for Italy 1979–1984
People from Viterbo